Borbor (also, Bor-bor and Bur-Bur) is a village in the Davachi Rayon of Azerbaijan.  The village forms part of the municipality of Padar.

References 

Populated places in Shabran District